The Crisis is Over (French: La crise est finie) is a 1934 French musical comedy film directed by Robert Siodmak and starring Albert Préjean, Danielle Darrieux and Marcel Carpentier. Many of those who worked on the film were exiles from Nazi Germany. It was made by Nero Films, which until recently had been based in Berlin.

Cast
 Albert Préjean as Marcel 
 Danielle Darrieux as Nicole 
 Marcel Carpentier as Bernouillin 
 Pedro Elviro as Hercule  
 Paul Velsa as Le machiniste 
 Paul Escoffier as Le manager  
 Milly Mathis as La gouvernante 
 Jeanne Marie-Laurent as La mère de Nicole  
 Régine Barry as Lola Garcin  
 Jane Loury as Mme Bernouillin  
 Suzanne Dehelly as Olga  
 René Lestelly as Alex  
 Alla Donell as Une girl  
 Wanda Barcella as Une girl 
 De Silva as Une girl  
 Sherry as Une girl  
 Véra Ossipova as Une girl  
 Adrienne Trenkel as Une girl   
 Albert Malbert as Le commissaire  
 Jacques Beauvais as Le maître d'hôtel  
 Raymond Blot as Un impresario

References

Bibliography 
 Bock, Hans-Michael & Bergfelder, Tim. The Concise CineGraph. Encyclopedia of German Cinema. Berghahn Books, 2009.

External links 
 

1934 films
1934 musical comedy films
1930s French-language films
Films scored by Franz Waxman
Films directed by Robert Siodmak
Paramount Pictures films
French black-and-white films
Films produced by Seymour Nebenzal
French musical comedy films
1930s French films